Kerowagi Urban LLG is a local-level government (LLG) of Chimbu Province, Papua New Guinea.

Wards
81. Kerowagi Urban

References

Local-level governments of Chimbu Province